The following is a list of football stadiums in Paraguay, ordered by capacity.

See also
 List of South American stadiums by capacity
 List of association football stadiums by capacity
 List of Stadiums in Paraguay

References

 
Paraguay
Football stadiums
stadiums